The Millionaire is a 1921 American silent drama film directed by Jack Conway and starring Herbert Rawlinson, Bert Roach and William Courtright.

Cast
 Herbert Rawlinson as Jack Norman 
 Bert Roach as Bobo Harmsworth 
 William Courtright as Simon Fisher 
 Verne Winter as Jimmy 
 Lillian Rich as Kate Blair 
 Margaret Mann as Grandmother 
 Frederick Vroom as Delmar 
 Mary Huntress as Mrs. Clever 
 Doris Pawn as Marion Culbreth 
 E. Alyn Warren as Evers

References

Bibliography
 James Robert Parish & Michael R. Pitts. Film directors: a guide to their American films. Scarecrow Press, 1974.

External links
 

1921 films
1921 drama films
1920s English-language films
American silent feature films
Silent American drama films
Films directed by Jack Conway
American black-and-white films
Universal Pictures films
1920s American films